Ińsko Landscape Park (Iński Park Krajobrazowy) is a protected area (Landscape Park) in north-western Poland, established in 1981, covering an area of .

The Park lies within West Pomeranian Voivodeship: in Łobez County (Gmina Węgorzyno) and Stargard County (Gmina Chociwel, Gmina Dobrzany, Gmina Ińsko).

Within the Landscape Park are three nature reserves.

References 

Landscape parks in Poland
Parks in West Pomeranian Voivodeship